Eucharis astrophiala is a species of plant which is endemic to Ecuador.  Its natural habitats are subtropical or tropical moist lowland forests and subtropical or tropical moist montane forests.

It is endangered by habitat loss.

References

Flora of Ecuador
astrophiala
Endangered plants
Plants described in 1985
Taxonomy articles created by Polbot